Cossus crassicornis is a moth in the family Cossidae. It is found in India.

References

Natural History Museum Lepidoptera generic names catalog

Cossus
Moths of Asia
Moths described in 1775
Taxa named by Johan Christian Fabricius